Obořiště is a municipality and village in Příbram District in the Central Bohemian Region of the Czech Republic. It has about 700 inhabitants.

Administrative parts
The village of Lhotka is an administrative part of Obořiště.

Geography
There are several ponds in the municipal territory, including Příkop in the centre of the village.

History
The first written mention of Obořiště is from 1333. From 1675 to 1680, the village was owned by Prague bishop Tomáš Pešina of Čechorod, who bequeathed it to the Order of Saint Paul the First Hermit. The order founded here a monastery, but it was abolished in 1786 and Obořiště was acquired by the royal chamber. The last owners before the establishment of the independent municipality in 1850 were the family of Colloredo-Mansfeld.

Transport
The D4 motorway passes through the municipality.

Sights
The landmark of Obořiště is the Baroque complex of the former monastery with the Church of Saint Joseph. The college was built in 1681–1688 and the church, probably according to the design by the architect Christoph Dientzenhofer, was built in 1701–1711.

References

External links

Villages in Příbram District